Utyz Imyani, Gabdrakhim (1752–1836) — was a tatar poet.
In the Islamic world he was also known as a scientist and recoverer of lost fragments of an ancient Quran (see Samarkand Kufic Quran).

The situation with the district prosecutor's office Gaisky 
In 2011 the district prosecutor's office in Gaisky (city Guy, Orenburg region) required to recognize extremist essay Abd al-Rahim Utyz Imyani "Pearl clarification".

References 
 Fәбдерәхим Усман //Башҡорт әҙәбиәте тарихы, 6 томда. 1-се том. Өфө, 1990.
 Ислам и мусульманская культура в Среднем Поволжье: история и современность. Очерки. — Казань: Мастер Лайн, 2002. / Г. Идиятуллина. Духовно-религиозная атмосфера в Поволжье в XVII—XVIII вв.
 Кемпер М. Габдерахим аль-Булгари аль-Утыз-Имани // Ислам на территории бывшей Российской империи. Вып. 2.-М.,1999.
 Кунафин Г. С. Культура Башкортостана и башкирская литература XIX — нач. ХХ вв.— Уфа, 2006.
 Хөсәйенов Ғ. Б. Утыҙ Имәни — Ғәбдрәхим Усман. // «Ватандаш», 1997, No. 12.
 Хусаинов Г. Б. Башкирская литература XI—XVIII вв. Уфа: Гилем, 1996.
 Литературный энциклопедический словарь / М.: Советской энциклопедии, 1987.
 Краткая литературная энциклопедия: В 9 т. — М.: Сов. Энцикл., 1962–1978.
 Харисов А. И. Литературное наследие башкирского народа. — Уфа: Башкирское книжное издательство, 1973. — с. 223.
 Абдуллин Я. Г. Татарская просветительская мысль [Текст] / Я. Г. Абдуллин. — Казань: Тат. кн. изд-во, 1976. — 320 с.
 Хусаинов Г. Б. Габдрахим Усман. // Башкортостан: краткая энциклопедия. — Уфа: Научное издательство «Башкирская энциклопедия», 1996. — 672 с. — С. 218.
 Габдрахим Усман.// История литературы Урала. Конец XIV—XVIII вв./ Гл. ред. В. В. Блажес, Е. К. Созина. М.: Языки славянской культуры, 2012. 608 с. — С.113—115.
 Хусаинов Г. Б. Усман Габдрахим аль-Булгари. // Башкирская энциклопедия. — Уфа: Научное издательство «Башкирская энциклопедия».

Notes 

Tatar writers
Muslim poets
1834 deaths
1752 births